Route 213 is a highway on the   Burin Peninsula of the island of Newfoundland in the Canadian province of Newfoundland and Labrador.  It is one of a small number of provincial routes that start and end on the same highway (in this case, Route 210).  It is a very short route, running for about 12 kilometres.  Due to being a rough road, the maximum speed limit is 60 km/h, except through communities where the speed limit is reduced to 30 km/h.  The western side of the route allows for a drive along the shore of Fortune Bay, until reaching the community of Frenchman's Cove (not to be confused with the West Coast community of the same name).  Midway along the route is Frenchman's Cove Provincial Park, one of only a small number of provincial parks in existence since 1997.  After exiting Frenchman's Cove, motorists travel along the Frenchman's Cove Barasway and enjoy more of a view of Fortune Bay until approaching the Town of Garnish.

Attractions along Route 213

Frenchman's Cove Provincial Park
Frenchman's Cove Barasway

Major intersections

References

213